ŠK Závažná Poruba is a Slovak football team, based in the village of Závažná Poruba. The club was founded in 1931.

External links 
at liptov.sk 
at ssfz.sk

References

Football clubs in Slovakia
Association football clubs established in 1931
1931 establishments in Slovakia